The 2016–17 Harvard Crimson women's basketball team represented Harvard University during the 2016–17 NCAA Division I women's basketball season. The Crimson, led by the head coach Kathy Delaney-Smith who was head coach for thirty five years, play their home games at the Lavietes Pavilion and were members of the Ivy League. They finished the season 21–9, 8–6 in Ivy League play to finish in third place. They had lost in the semifinal of the Ivy women's tournament to Princeton. They were invited to the WNIT where they defeated New Hampshire in the first round by scoring more points than they got, before losing to St. John's in the second round by getting less points than they got.

Ivy League changes
This season, the Ivy League will institute conference postseason tournaments. The tournaments will only award the Ivy League automatic bids for the NCAA Division I Men's and Women's Basketball Tournaments; the official conference championships will continue to be awarded based solely on regular-season results. The Ivy League playoff will take place March 11 and 12 at the Palestra in Philadelphia. There will be two semifinal games on the first day with the No. 1 seed playing the No. 4 seed and the No. 2 seed playing the No. 3 seed. The final will be played the next day for the NCAA bid.

Roster

Schedule

|-
!colspan=8 style="background:#991111; color:#FFFFFF;"| Regular season

|-
!colspan=8 style="background:#991111; color:#FFFFFF;"|  Ivy League tournament

|-
!colspan=9 style="background:#991111;"| Women's National Invitation tournament

Rankings
2016–17 NCAA Division I women's basketball rankings

See also
 2016–17 Harvard Crimson men's basketball team

References

Harvard
Harvard Crimson women's basketball seasons
Harvard Crimson women's basketball
Harvard Crimson women's basketball
2017 Women's National Invitation Tournament participants
Harvard Crimson women's basketball
Harvard Crimson women's basketball